David Michael Hodgson is the Todd Fellow and Tutor in Chemistry at Oriel College, Oxford.

Hodgson achieved his Bachelor of Science at the University of Bath and gained his Doctor of Philosophy from the University of Southampton. His research interests are in synthesis, broadly encompassing studies directed towards the design and development of new methods, reagents and strategies for the synthesis of biologically active molecules.

Publications 
 
 
 
 'Intramolecular Cyclopropanation of Unsaturated Terminal Epoxides' D. M. Hodgson, Y. K. Chung and J.-M. Paris, J. Am. Chem. Soc., 2004, 126, 8664.

References 

Fellows of Oriel College, Oxford
Alumni of the University of Bath
Alumni of the University of Southampton
Living people
Year of birth missing (living people)